Vorpommern-Rügen – Vorpommern-Greifswald I is an electoral constituency (German: Wahlkreis) represented in the Bundestag. It elects one member via first-past-the-post voting. Under the current constituency numbering system, it is designated as constituency 15. It is located in northeast Mecklenburg-Vorpommern, comprising the Vorpommern-Rügen district and a small part of the Vorpommern-Greifswald district.

Vorpommern-Rügen – Vorpommern-Greifswald I was created for the inaugural 1990 federal election after German reunification. Since 2021, it has been represented by Anna Kassautzki of the Social Democratic Party (SPD).

Geography
Vorpommern-Rügen – Vorpommern-Greifswald I is located in northeast Mecklenburg-Vorpommern. As of the 2021 federal election, it comprises the entirety of the Vorpommern-Rügen district, as well as the municipality of Greifswald and the Amt of Landhagen from the Vorpommern-Greifswald district.

History
Vorpommern-Rügen – Vorpommern-Greifswald I was created after German reunification in 1990, then known as Stralsund – Rügen – Grimmen. Until 2002, it was constituency 267 in the numbering system. Originally, it comprised the now-abolished districts of Grimmen, Rügen, and Stralsund, and the independent city of Stralsund. In the 2002 election, it was expanded to contain the former Ribnitz-Damgarten district, which had been abolished in 1994; it now covered the entirety of the later-abolished Nordvorpommern district. At this time, it was renamed to Stralsund – Nordvorpommern – Rügen, and acquired its current constituency number of 15. In the 2013 election, it was further expanded to include the independent city of Greifswald and the Amt of Landhagen, and was renamed to Vorpommern-Rügen – Vorpommern-Greifswald I.

Members
The constituency was held continuously by Angela Merkel of the Christian Democratic Union (CDU) from its formation until her retirement. Merkel served as leader of the CDU from 2000 and Chancellor of Germany from 2005 until 2021. In the 2021 federal election, it was won by Anna Kassautzki of the Social Democratic Party (SPD).

Election results

2021 election

2017 election

2013 election

2009 election

References

Federal electoral districts in Mecklenburg-Western Pomerania
Greifswald
Rügen
2013 establishments in Germany
Constituencies established in 2013